"El Biscella" is an Italian song in Milanese dialect from the early 1960s composed by Giovanni D'Anzi and Alfredo Bracchi.

History 

"Biscella" is a Milanese word meaning "curly" (derived from bisc-bish, meaning hedgehog), a kind of bully who tries to intimidate people, but whose clumsy manners and extravagant costumes make him more comical than dangerous.

The song tells the story of a "biscella" that lives in Porta Ticinese neighbourhood who goes to parties, and that everyone behind his back laughs for his ridiculous clothes and his awkward way of dancing.

References

External links

 El Biscella Songtext von Nanni Svampa

Italian folk songs
Songs about language
Italian songs
Culture in Milan
1960 songs